Walter Howard Frere  (23 November 1863 – 2 April 1938) was a co-founder of the Anglican religious order the Community of the Resurrection, Mirfield, and Bishop of Truro (1923–1935).

Biography
Frere was born in Cambridge, England, on 23 November 1863, the younger son of Philip Howard Frere and his wife Emily, née Gipps. His siblings were Arthur, Ellen and Lucy. Lucy became the wife of Wilfred J. Barnes. He was educated at Trinity College, Cambridge and Wells Theological College; and ordained in 1889. His first post was as a curate at Stepney Parish Church. He was Examining Chaplain to the Bishop of Southwark from 1896 to 1909.

Frere was twice Superior of the order 1902–1913 and 1916–1922, and returned to it after resigning the see of Truro. He was consecrated bishop at Westminster Abbey on 1 November 1923, by Randall Davidson, Archbishop of Canterbury; and as he regarded membership of a religious order an obligation taking precedence over others, the bishop's palace became a branch house of the Community.

Frere assisted the Indian Malankara Orthodox Church with the foundation of the Bethany religious order in 1919: however the dioceses forming this church were received into the Roman Catholic communion in 1930.

He was a member of the Anglican delegation to the Malines Conversations in the 1920s, and active in various other ecumenical projects including relations with the Russian Orthodox Church. He was a noted liturgical historical scholar; he was also a high churchman and a supporter of Catholic ideas. In his early writings and addresses he emphasised the importance of spiritual life, and explained some of the liturgical revision which was then in preparation.

He played a major part in the proposed revision of the Church of England Book of Common Prayer in 1928, which was later rejected by Parliament, and was responsible for the service book for the Guild of the Servants of the Sanctuary. Some of the books which belonged to Walter Frere form part of the Mirfield Collection which is housed in the University of York Special Collections.

He died on 2 April 1938 and was buried at Mirfield.

Bibliography
Recollections of Malines, 1935. Concerning discussions with Cardinal Mercier, Old Catholic Archbishop.
A Collection of his Papers on Liturgical and Historical Subjects, Alcuin Club, 1940.
Correspondence on liturgical revision and construction, Alcuin Club, 1954.
The Use of Sarum, 2 vols. 1898 and 1901.
A New History of the Book of Common Prayer (based on F. Procter's earlier work), 1901.
A Manual of Plainsong for Divine Service containing the Canticles Noted [and] the Psalter Noted to Gregorian Tones together with the Litany and Responses, edited by Frere and H. B. Briggs, Novello and Company, London, 1902.
The Principles of Religious Ceremonial, 1906.
Black Letter Saints' Days, 1938. Providing eucharistic propers for a selection of saints in the interim 1928 Prayer Book Calendar.

References

Citations

Works cited

 
 
 
 
 
 

1863 births
1938 deaths
20th-century Church of England bishops
Alumni of Trinity College, Cambridge
Alumni of Wells Theological College
Anglo-Catholic bishops
Anglo-Catholic socialists
Bishops of Truro
Burials in West Yorkshire
English Christian socialists
Anglican monks
Anglican liturgists
English Anglo-Catholics
Walter Howard